Lennon Kathleen  Parham (born October 26, 1975) is an American actress and improvisational comedian from the Upright Citizens Brigade Theatre. With frequent collaborator Jessica St. Clair, she created and co-starred in NBC's Best Friends Forever and USA Network's Playing House. She also co-starred in the CBS sitcom Accidentally on Purpose from 2009 to 2010. More recently, she has appeared in the HBO Max series Minx.

Early life
Parham was born in Marietta, Georgia. She attended Parkview High School in Lilburn, Georgia, and graduated with a B.S. Degree in Theatre from the University of Evansville. Following college, she taught French for two years at T. L. Weston High School in Greenville, Mississippi, as part of the Teach For America program.

Career
After her stint as a French teacher, Parham began performing comedy with the Upright Citizens Brigade Theatre. During this time, she starred in the two-person show The Adventures of Lock & Kay and the one-woman show She Tried to be Normal. In the fall of 2009, Parham began a supporting role in the comedy Accidentally on Purpose.

Parham and frequent collaborator Jessica St. Clair created and starred in the NBC comedy Best Friends Forever, which ran for one season in 2012. Their second sitcom, Playing House, premiered on USA on April 29, 2014, and lasted three seasons. In 2015, Parham and St. Clair spun-off their Comedy Bang! Bang! characters Wompler and Listler for a new Earwolf podcast called WOMP It Up!, with St. Clair as host Marissa Wompler and Parham co-hosting as Marissa's teacher Charlotte Listler. Frequent guests on the podcast include Brian Huskey as Marissa's stepdad "Seth" and Jason Mantzoukas as Marissa's former flame Eric "Gutterballs" Gutterman.

Parham has made appearances on television programs such as Veep, Parks and Recreation, Comedy Bang! Bang!, Bad Judge, Arrested Development, Lady Dynamite, Review, and Mad Men. In 2019 and 2020, she was a main cast member of the ABC sitcom, Bless This Mess, starring Lake Bell and Dax Shepard. Her notable work in film includes Confessions of a Shopaholic, Splinterheads, and Horrible Bosses 2.

Parham was a guest on The Big Alakens Big Lake marathon fundraiser episode of The George Lucas Talk Show.

Personal life
Parham is married to Javier Guzman. Their daughter Saraya was born on April 21, 2013. Their second child was born in October 2016.

Filmography

References

External links

1976 births
Living people
21st-century American actresses
Actresses from Alabama
Actresses from Georgia (U.S. state)
American film actresses
American podcasters
American television actresses
American television writers
American women comedians
People from Bullock County, Alabama
People from Lilburn, Georgia
University of Evansville alumni
American women television writers
Upright Citizens Brigade Theater performers
Teach For America alumni
Screenwriters from Georgia (U.S. state)
Screenwriters from Alabama
21st-century American comedians
American women television producers
21st-century American screenwriters
American women podcasters
Television producers from Alabama
Television producers from Georgia (U.S. state)